Berkeley station may refer to:

Berkeley station (Atchison, Topeka and Santa Fe Railway), a former train station in Berkeley, California
Berkeley station (Southern Pacific Railroad), a former train station in Berkeley, California
Berkeley station (California), an Amtrak station in Berkeley, California
Berkeley station (Illinois), a Metra commuter rail station in Berkeley, Illinois
Berkeley railway station, a former station in Berkeley, Gloucestershire, England
Downtown Berkeley (BART station), a Bay Area Rapid Transit station in Berkeley, California

See also
Berkeley (disambiguation)